Theresa Thomason is an American Gospel music singer.

Musical career
Thomason reached the airwaves with Fresh Enuff, a popular club single and a winning performance at the Apollo Theater in New York City. She toured Europe for over 10 years, performing in over 150 European cities. She remains a featured artist with the Paul Winter Consort at the annual Solstice, Missa Gaia and Earth Mass celebrations at St. John the Divine, the world-renowned cathedral in New York City. Many of these performances were televised on PBS and NBC. Thomason has also performed live at the United Nations for the Dalai Lama and others.

In 1999, Thomason collaborated with composer Paul Halley on the Pelagos recording of "Sound Over All Waters." They continue to perform this piece together in many variations in Europe, New Zealand, New York, Canada and Connecticut.

Thomason appeared onstage with the American progressive metal band Dream Theater on the Metropolis 2000 world tour, after having appeared on their Metropolis Pt. 2: Scenes from a Memory album. In addition to reprising her vocal parts for the album, Thomason sang on "John and Theresa Solo Spot," improvising over a John Petrucci guitar solo, and sang on "The Spirit Carries On." Performances were filmed and released on DVD and CD under the name Metropolis 2000: Scenes From New York.

Thomason's newest CD release, Ten Hymns, is her first solo recording. It was released in 2004 for a specialized project, through Sacred Sounds Music, and is regarded as acoustic gospel.  She was also the featured soloist on the jazz project Breakaway by Paul Sullivan of River Music.

Thomason continued to perform with Dream Theater and performed Clare Torry's famous vocal improvisation on "The Great Gig in the Sky" when the band covered Pink Floyd's The Dark Side of the Moon at the Heineken Music Hall in Amsterdam, the Netherlands on October 11, 2005, and the Hammersmith Apollo in London on October 25, 2005. The London show was recorded and released again on both DVD and CD through Dream Theater's YtseJam Records.

Theresa Thomason has toured for over 13 years in the most hallowed theaters of Europe and performed at the Vatican in 2005. Her career has spanned over two decades of performances and recordings with the Grammy Award-winning Paul Winter Consort, Pete Seeger, Dream Theater, renowned conductor John Rutter, actor and leader Ruby Dee, jazz group FRENS, and many others. Thomason continues to expand her range, style, and creativity, and has her own acclaimed musical production called "The Sisterhood."

Thomason has performed in "Hot Feet," the Broadway musical conceived, choreographed, and directed by Maurice Hines and featuring music from Earth, Wind & Fire. She will return to Europe with her production of "The Sisters" in the winter/spring of 2009.
Recently Thomason performed two sold out concerts at the Zenith in Strasbourg, France, and Les Dominicains De Haute
Alsace, a first for the Protestant Union in France.

References

Living people
American women singers
American gospel singers
Year of birth missing (living people)
21st-century American women